Eubranchus sanjuanensis is a species of sea slug or nudibranch, a marine gastropod mollusc in the family Eubranchidae.

Distribution
This species was described from Friday Harbour, San Juan Island, Washington. It is reported as far north as Mountain Point, Ketchikan, Alaska. It is reported to be fairly common in British Columbia, Canada in two colour forms. It has also been reported from Cobscook Bay on the Atlantic coast of North America.

References

Eubranchidae
Gastropods described in 1972